The Grotta dell' Arco is a large, shallow cave on the island of Capri, Italy. It faces east, and is situated about 240 m above sea level, under the cliffs which are south-east of the Castello Barbarossa.

References

Caves of Campania
Capri, Campania